Hank is an album by jazz tenor saxophonist Hank Mobley released on the Blue Note label in 1957 as BLP 1560, and features Mobley, trumpeter Donald Byrd, alto saxophonist John Jenkins, pianist Bobby Timmons, bassist Wilbur Ware and drummer  “Philly” Joe Jones.

Reception
The Allmusic review awarded the album 4 stars".

Track listing 
All compositions by Hank Mobley except as indicated.

 "Fit for a Hanker" - 7:24
 "Hi Groove, Low Feedback" - 9:56
 "You'd Be So Easy to Love" (Porter) - 5:39
 "Time After Time" (Cahn, Styne) - 6:48
 "Dance of the Infidels" (Powell) - 7:54

Personnel 
 Hank Mobley - tenor saxophone
 John Jenkins - alto saxophone
 Donald Byrd - trumpet
 Bobby Timmons - piano
 Wilbur Ware - bass
 Philly Joe Jones - drums

References 

1957 albums
Albums produced by Alfred Lion
Albums recorded at Van Gelder Studio
Blue Note Records albums
Hank Mobley albums
Hard bop albums